Portland Downtown Heliport  is a public heliport located in the Old Town Chinatown neighborhood in the northwest section of the city of Portland, Multnomah County, Oregon, United States. It occupies the roof of a 1989 parking garage located at the intersection of NW Naito Parkway and NW Davis Street, not far from the Steel Bridge over the Willamette River.

The Downtown Heliport currently has the distinction of being Oregon's only public use heliport. It averages 99 aircraft operations per week.

References

External links

 Entry, including photo, of the structure in Portland's online GIS database

Heliports in Oregon
Airports in Portland, Oregon
Old Town Chinatown
Northwest Portland, Oregon
Airports in Multnomah County, Oregon